Jack Louis Nix (born Niksch; May 7, 1928) was an American and Canadian football player who played for the San Francisco 49ers and Saskatchewan Roughriders. He played college football at the University of Southern California. He married Celia May Park of Regina in 1952.

References

1928 births
San Francisco 49ers players
Saskatchewan Roughriders players
Living people